The Girl with the Pistol is a 1968 Italian comedy film directed by Mario Monicelli. It was nominated for the Academy Award for Best Foreign Language Film. Monica Vitti won the David di Donatello as Best Actress.

The film tackled the themes of bride kidnapping and honour killing, which were still relevant in the Southern Italian culture of the time and normalized to some extent by Italian law, and had then only recently been challenged when Franca Viola publicly refused to marry the man who raped her.

Plot
In a small village in Sicily, the young woman Assunta falls in love with Vincenzo, who serenades her under the window of the house where she lives with her sisters.

One day, Assunta is walking down the street with her sisters when two men in a car cut them off, and a passer-by warns them they are attempting bride kidnapping.

Sensing the men are sent by Vincenzo to kidnap her, Assunta throws herself into their car, but when she finally meets Vincenzo he explains that he was actually trying to kidnap her cousin Concetta. Since he refuses to marry her and flees to the United Kingdom in order to avoid arrest, Assunta has no choice but to head back to her village.

However, according to local traditions she and her sisters are now unable to marry, unless someone kills the offender and restores the honour of the family. For this reason she leaves for the UK too, having been given 10,000 lira in notes and a handgun. She is intimidated by the different culture at first, but resolutely travels to Edinburgh, Sheffield and Bath in search of Vincenzo, in order to kill him.

While attending a rugby match in Bath, Assunta spots Vincenzo in his new job as an ambulance stretcher bearer. She follows him to the nearby hospital, but accidentally interrupts an operation and faints. During her recuperation she meets another patient, Frank, understanding and sentimental, who advises her to forget about Vincenzo and devote herself to her own life. After Vincenzo simulates his own death, Assunta gets engaged to Frank. However, Dr Osborne, the physician who treated both Frank and Assunta in the hospital, feels obliged to tell her that Frank is, in fact, a homosexual. Hence she gives up the marriage, and despite agreeing to return to Italy instead starts a new life as an emancipated singleton in London.

In the meantime, Vincenzo becomes more and more disappointed with British women and is aware of the fact that he cannot return to Italy, so he manages to contact Assunta. Her first reaction is to try and kill him, but he explains his intention to marry her on condition that she gives up her freedom. Having given herself to him once again, the next day Assunta exacts revenge by abandoning Vincenzo and taking a boat to join Dr Osborne. Vincenzo, having tried to catch up with her, watches her leaving and judges her an "easy girl".

Filming locations
The early 'Sicilian' scenes were actually shot in Polignano a Mare in Apulia, not in Sicily. Filming locations in Edinburgh included Waverley Station, Princes Street, Lawnmarket and Castle Terrace, while in Sheffield several scenes were shot in Granville Street and near the site of the former Neepsend railway station, as well as at the now redeveloped bus station in nearby Rotherham. Other landmarks shown in the film include the Clifton Suspension Bridge in Bristol; Royal Crescent in Bath; Holy Trinity Church in Bradford-on-Avon, Wiltshire; the Elephant and Castle, Royal Albert Hall, Chelsea Embankment and Lincoln's Inn Fields in London; and the Royal Pavilion and Grand Hotel in Brighton. The final scene, which features Assunta escaping from Vincenzo's clutches and onto a car ferry, was filmed separately in Newhaven and Ancona.

Cast

 Monica Vitti as Assunta Patanè
 Stanley Baker as Dr. Osborne
 Carlo Giuffrè as Vincenzo Macaluso
 Corin Redgrave as Frank Hogan
 Anthony Booth as John
 Aldo Puglisi as Sicilian immigrant
 Tiberio Murgia as Sicilian immigrant
 Dominic Allan as Mr. Sullivan
 Deborah Stanford as Mrs. Sullivan
 Catherine Feller as Rosina Canunzio
 Helen Downing as Ada
 Janet Brandes as Nurse
 Natasha Harwood as Mrs. Osborne
 Stefano Satta Flores as the waiter at the Capri restaurant
 Johnny Briggs as the cad at the dance (uncredited)
 Yutte Stensgaard as the blonde at the party (uncredited)

Reception
The Girl with the Pistol was wildly popular in Italy, garnering nearly $4 million in box office receipts by June 1969, and was regarded as heralding the emergence of Monica Vitti as one of the country's leading comic stars. In the UK, the film was not shown in cinemas.

References

External links
 
 

1968 films
1968 comedy films
1960s Italian-language films
Films directed by Mario Monicelli
Commedia all'italiana
Films set in Sicily
Films set in England
Films about immigration
Italian films about revenge
Films set in London
1960s Italian films